Darren Hynes (born 12 January 1999) is a Scottish footballer, who plays as a defender for Scottish League One club Clyde. He previously played for Greenock Morton, and has also played on loan for Gretna 2008.

Club career
Hynes came through the Greenock Morton youth academy after signing from Aberdeen in 2015. He made his debut against Inverness Caledonian Thistle in May 2018.

In September 2020, Hynes was loaned out to Lowland League club Gretna 2008 until January 2021. Hynes would leave the club in January 2023 by mutual consent.

On 12 January 2023, Hynes signed an 18-month deal with Scottish League One club Clyde.

Career statistics

Honours
SPFL Development League West: Winners (2) 2015-16, 2017-18

References

External links

1999 births
Aberdeen F.C. players
Association football defenders
Greenock Morton F.C. players
Gretna F.C. 2008 players
Living people
Scottish footballers
Scottish Professional Football League players
Lowland Football League players
Footballers from Glasgow

Clyde F.C. players